Patuxent may refer to:

People
 Patuxent people, an Algonquian people indigenous to what is now the Mid-Atlantic United States

Places and geological features
 Patuxent, Maryland, an unincorporated community in Charles County
 Patuxent Ice Stream, between the Patuxent Range and Pecora Escarpment
 Patuxent Range, a mountain chain in Antarctica
 Patuxent River, Maryland
 Patuxent Wildlife Research Center, a U.S. Fish and Wildlife Service facility in Beltsville, Maryland
 Naval Air Station Patuxent River, an installation of the United States Navy in St. Mary's County, Maryland
 Calvert County, Maryland, once known as Patuxent County
 Woodwardville, Maryland, an unincorporated community known as Patuxent from 1927 to the 1980s

Other
 Patuxent River stone, the state gem of Maryland
 , sea-going tugboat in commission with the United States Navy from 1909 to 1924
 , an oiler in commission with the United States Navy from 1942 to 1946
 , a fleet replenishment oiler in service with the United States Navy since 1995.